Tom Prendergast may refer to:
 Tom Prendergast (Laois footballer), played 1976–87
 Tom Prendergast (Kerry footballer), played 1966–73

See also
 Thomas Prendergast (disambiguation)